This is an alphabetical list of Berlin U-Bahn stations.  Currently, there are 175 active stations.

A

B

C

D

E

F

G

H

I

J

K

L

M

N

O

P

R

S

T

U

V

W

Y

Z

References 

 
Railway stations (U-Bahn)
Berlin U-Bahn stations, List of
Berlin